Maximiliano Jones (born 17 June 1944) is a Spanish bobsledder. He competed in the two-man and the four-man events at the 1968 Winter Olympics.

References

External links
 

1944 births
Living people
Sportspeople from Malabo
Spanish male bobsledders
Olympic bobsledders of Spain
Bobsledders at the 1968 Winter Olympics
Spanish sportspeople of Equatoguinean descent
People of Liberated African descent
21st-century African-American people